Phloeopora is a genus of beetles belonging to the family Staphylinidae.

The species of this genus are found in Europe, Australia and America.

Species:
 Phloeopora adversa Casey, 1911 
 Phloeopora africana Bernhauer, 1915

References

Staphylinidae
Staphylinidae genera